The Muhlach family is a Filipino family of entertainers.

List of members

 Álvaro Muhlach Agüera married Concepcion Borja Amador; they had three children
 Alvaro Muhlach 
 ∞ married Anita Aquino
 Aga Muhlach 
 ∞ married Charlene Gonzales, they have two children. Aga's children have appeared in 
 Andres Muhlach
 Atasha Muhlach
 with Janice de Belen had
 Luigi Muhlach
 Arlene Muhlach 
 ∞ married Warren Dandoy, they have two children.
 fathered
 Almira Muhlach 
 ∞ married Paul Alvarez, they have three children: Alyssa, Illa and Inna 
 Alyssa Muhlach Alexander Muhlach 
 ∞ married Rebecca Rocha, had two children
 Niño Muhlach
 ∞ married Edith Millare, have one child
 Sandro Muhlach
 with Diane Tupaz, have
 Alonzo Muhlach
 Amalia Fuentes 
 ∞ married '''Romeo Vasquez, had three children
 Liezl Martinez ∞ married Albert Martinez, have three child
 Alfonso Martinez Alyanna Martinez' Alissa Martinez ∞ married Paulus Reyes Amati Mari''

References 

Muhlach family
Show business families of the Philippines